Barming Heath is an area of north-western Maidstone in Kent, England. Its parish church is dedicated to St Andrew.

See also
Barming
East Barming
Oakwood Hospital

Villages in Kent